The 2001 Eastern Creek V8 Supercar round was the third round of the 2001 Shell Championship Series. It was held on the weekend of 28 to 29 November at Eastern Creek Raceway in Sydney, New South Wales.

Race report 

Following the Clipsal 500, there was controversy in relation to incidents going unpunished by race officials. For this event, the officials commented that they would be more strict on any offences.

Craig Lowndes initially won race one, with Marcos Ambrose finishing second. This result was overturned, however after Lowndes and Ambrose were penalized for two separate incidents throughout the race. Lowndes was given a time penalty for passing Greg Murphy under safety car conditions, which saw him relegated to 12th. Ambrose was given a time penalty for an illegal overtake on Murphy which saw the rookie bumped back to 13th for race two. After these penalties were enforced, Murphy was declared the winner.

Mark Skaife took a commanding race two win after Murphy was penalized for a jump-start. Whilst serving his penalty (which was a stop-go), Murphy did not come to a complete stop, which prompted some to query whether he should have to serve the penalty again. The stewards deemed him to have served a penalty and so did not request him to serve the penalty again.

Skaife won the round with team-mate Jason Bright taking second and Murphy in third.

Race results

Qualifying

Top Ten Shootout

Race 1

Race 2

Championship Standings

References

External links 

Eastern Creek
Motorsport at Eastern Creek Raceway